The Gamers was a wargaming company founded and run by Dean Essig in Homer, Illinois.  Their distinction was the focus on a few series, with special rules for each individual game.  This made it easier to play new games within a series that was well known to the players.  Homercon, a convention for The Gamers games was held each September in Homer, IL from 1990 until 2012.  This company was bought out by Multi-Man Publishing in 2001 who continues to publish new materials for the original Gamers series and new games and game series designed by Dean Essig.

Games
The Gamers produce games in several different series:

 CWB – The Civil War Brigade Series simulates battles at the brigade level during the American Civil War.
 RSS/LoB – The Regimental Sub-System Series / Line of Battle simulates battles at the regimental level during the American Civil War.
 TCS – The Tactical Combat Series simulates 20th century platoon level battles.
 OCS – The Operational Combat Series simulates 20th century battles at levels ranging from battalions to divisions.
 SCS – The Standard Combat Series is a general system which is easy (yet still challenging) and allows simulation of a wide range of battles.
 NBS – The Napoleonic Brigade Series simulates brigade level battles during the Napoleonic Wars.
 BCS – The Battalion Combat Series simulates 20th century battles at the battalion level.
 The Modern TCS series has been discontinued.

References

External links
 The Gamers Archive Rules, errata, etc. for all of The Gamers games
 MMP Producers of current The Gamers products and brand owner of older games

Board game publishing companies
Defunct companies based in Illinois
Wargame companies